MP Motorsport is a Dutch auto racing team currently competing in the FIA Formula 2 Championship, FIA Formula 3 Championship,Formula Regional European by Alpine Championship, Eurocup 3, Spanish Formula 4 Championship, and will start racing in the newly announced F1 Academy in 2023 as well. The team has also participated in Auto GP, Eurocup Formula Renault 2.0 and Formula Renault 2.0 Northern European Cup in conjunction with Manor Competition, using the name Manor MP Motorsport in the past.

Background
MP Motorsport were founded in 1995 by Marcel Peters; it started as Marcel Peters Motorsport which eventually turned into MP Motorsport. The squad competed in local Benelux and Dutch Formula Ford championships.

In 2003, team joined Formula Renault 2.0 series, competing in Eurocup and Benelux championships. In 2008 MP Motorsport entered the EUROCUP Formula Renault 2.0 series and made an immediate impact when Paul Meijer won at the team's debut in the Series at Spa Francorchamps

In 2011, MP Motorsport graduated to Auto GP. For the next year team joined forces with Manor Competition in Auto GP World Series, Eurocup Formula Renault 2.0 and Formula Renault 2.0 Northern European Cup.

MP Motorsport joined GP2 Series in 2013, replacing Scuderia Coloni. 2012 Auto GP World Series champion Adrian Quaife-Hobbs signed with the team alongside Daniël de Jong, who raced for Manor MP Motorsport in the Auto GP World Series and Rapax in the GP2 Series throughout the 2012 season. MP achieved their first podium at the GP2 sprint race in Monaco, with Quaife-Hobbs finishing second behind race winner Stefano Coletti from Rapax.

The team took their first GP2 victory in 2014, when Marco Sorensen won the sprint race in Sochi despite a late challenge from both Stoffel Vandoorne and Felipe Nasr.

After an uneventful 2015 season (with the exception of a podium from Sergio Canamasas in the Monaco feature race), the team achieved its highest points scoring place in the constructor's championship in the 2016 season, mostly from the performances of Oliver Rowland. The team also partook in the SMP F4 and Spanish F4 championships, with Red Bull Junior Richard Verschoor claiming both titles with the team and Jarno Opmeer finishing SMP F4 vice-champion.

In November 2016, it was announced MP would go into the 2017 season with Sérgio Sette Câmara. In February 2017, Jordan King joined the team. In 2017, MP also made its return to the Eurocup Formula Renault 2.0 championship, fielding Verschoor, Opmeer and new Red Bull Junior Neil Verhagen. For the SMP F4 Championship, MP signed Tristan Charpentier, Lukas Dunner, Bent Viscaal and Renault Sport Academy driver Christian Lundgaard, with Lundgaard claiming the title at the Moscow Raceway. The team also contested the Spanish F4 Championship with Lundgaard, Dunner, Viscaal and other Renault junior Marta García.

The team remained in Formula 2, signing Ralph Boschung and Roberto Merhi as their drivers. In 2018, the team expanded to the GP3 Series, replacing DAMS. For the inaugural campaign they signed with Dorian Boccolacci and Niko Kari. They were accompanied by Will Palmer in the first round. Max Defourny, Christian Lundgaard and Alex Peroni will join the squad in the Eurocup Formula Renault 2.0. Isac Blomqvist, Amaury Cordeel and Patrick Schott represented the team in the 2018 SMP F4 Championship and 2018 F4 Spanish Championship, with Cordeel claiming the latter title.

In 2019, the team signed Cordeel, Lorenzo Colombo and Renault junior Victor Martins for their Formula Renault Eurocup campaign and stayed on in the newly rebranded FIA Formula 3 Championship, fielding Richard Verschoor, Simo Laaksonen and Red Bull Junior Liam Lawson. For the Spanish F4 Championship, MP signed championship returnee Rafael Villanueva, Jr. and acquired karting graduate Nicolas Baert, UAE F4 race winner Tijmen van der Helm and KNAF-backed racer Glenn van Berlo. In the FIA Formula 2 Championship, the team fielded Jordan King and Mahaveer Raghunathan. Raghunathan would provide for very erratic and sometimes dangerous driving, which culminated in him collecting 24 penalty points throughout the whole year.

Current series results

FIA Formula 2 Championship

In detail
(key) (Races in bold indicate pole position) (Races in italics indicate fastest lap)

FIA Formula 3 Championship

* Season still in progress.

In detail
(key) (Races in bold indicate pole position) (Races in italics indicate fastest lap)

* Season still in progress.

Formula Regional European Championship 

† Masson drove for ART Grand Prix from round 7 onwards, while Boya drove for ART Grand Prix prior to round 7. Braschi drove for KIC Motorsport prior to round 6. After competing for MP Motorsport in round 6 he switched to the FA Racing by MP moniker prior to round 7.

* Season still in progress.

In detail 
(key) (Races in bold indicate pole position) (Races in italics indicate fastest lap)

* Season still in progress.

F4 Spanish Championship

24H GT Series - GT3

Formula 4 UAE Championship

Formula Regional Middle East Championship

Former series results

GP2 Series

In detail 
(key) (Races in bold indicate pole position) (Races in italics indicate fastest lap)

GP3 Series

In detail 
(key) (Races in bold indicate pole position) (Races in italics indicate fastest lap)

SMP F4 Championship

F3 Asian Championship

Toyota Racing Series

Eurocup Formula Renault 2.0

† Ptáček drove for R-ace GP until Round 7.

Timeline

Notes

References

External links

 

Dutch auto racing teams
Auto racing teams established in 1996
Formula Renault Eurocup teams
GP2 Series teams
Sports car racing teams
1996 establishments in the Netherlands
Auto GP teams
FIA Formula 2 Championship teams
GP3 Series teams
FIA Formula 3 Championship teams
Sport in Hoeksche Waard
Formula Regional European Championship teams